Alm is a river in the Austrian state of Upper Austria.

The Alm's source is the lake Almsee. It is a right tributary of the Traun, which it meets near the town of Fischlham. Its largest tributary is the Laudach.

Municipalities along the river are Grünau im Almtal, Scharnstein, Pettenbach, Vorchdorf, Steinerkirchen an der Traun and Bad Wimsbach-Neydharting.

The quality of the water is at a high level (drinking water). Fishes in the Alm comprise: Brown trout, Rainbow trout, Brook trout and Grayling.

References

Rivers of Upper Austria
Rivers of Austria